Kyle J. Kremer is a retired United States Air Force major general who last served as the Director of Strategic Plans, Requirements and Programs of the Air Mobility Command. Previously, he was the Director of Global Reach Programs of the Office of the Assistant Secretary of the Air Force for Acquisition, Technology and Logistics.

References

Living people
Place of birth missing (living people)
Recipients of the Defense Superior Service Medal
Recipients of the Legion of Merit
United States Air Force generals
Year of birth missing (living people)